is a Japanese track and field athlete. She competed in the women's javelin throw at the 1956 Summer Olympics.

References

1935 births
Living people
Place of birth missing (living people)
Japanese female javelin throwers
Olympic female javelin throwers
Olympic athletes of Japan
Athletes (track and field) at the 1956 Summer Olympics
Asian Games gold medalists in athletics (track and field)
Asian Games gold medalists for Japan
Athletes (track and field) at the 1958 Asian Games
Medalists at the 1958 Asian Games
Japan Championships in Athletics winners
20th-century Japanese women